Hellfire Club, released on 15 March 2004, is the sixth album by German power metal band Edguy. The music of the band is supported by a German orchestra, the Deutsches Filmorchester Babelsberg. It is the band's first album released via Nuclear Blast.

Track listing
All lyrics by Tobias Sammet. All music by Sammet except where noted.

 "Mysteria" (Sammet, Jens Ludwig) – 5:44
 "The Piper Never Dies" – 10:05
 "We Don't Need a Hero" – 5:30
 "Down to the Devil" – 5:27
 "King of Fools" – 4:21
 "Forever" – 5:40
 "Under the Moon" (Sammet, Ludwig) – 5:04
 "Lavatory Love Machine" – 4:25
 "Rise of the Morning Glory" – 4:39
 "Lucifer in Love" – 0:32
 "Navigator" (Sammet, Ludwig) – 5:22
 "The Spirit Will Remain" – 4:12
 "Children of Steel" – 4:03 (bonus track - 2004 version)
 "Mysteria" (Sammet, Ludwig) – 5:32 (bonus track featuring Mille Petrozza of Kreator)
 "Heavenward" (Sammet, Ludwig) - 5:17 ('Navigator' demo version)

Hong Kong bonus disc
A special bonus disc containing 13 additional tracks was also released with the album in Hong Kong. Among its tracks are all the tracks from the King of Fools EP (other than "King of Fools" itself, which is on disc 1), the 3 bonus tracks mentioned above, an alternative version of "Falling Down" and 5 live tracks, including one by Tobias Sammet's side project Avantasia: "Inside".

 "New Age Messiah" (as featured on the King of Fools EP) – 6:00
 "Children of Steel" (as above) – 4:04
 "Mysteria" (featuring Mille Petrozza) (as above) – 5:32
 "The Savage Union" (as featured on the King of Fools EP) – 4:15
 "Falling Down" (alternative version) – 4:37
 "Holy Water" (as featured on the King of Fools EP) – 4:17
 "Introduction" (live) – 1:01
 "Tears of a Mandrake" (live) – 7:55
 "Painting on the Wall" (live) – 4:39
 "Inside" (live) – 4:17
 "Fairytale" (live) – 6:22
 "Life and Times of a Bonus Track" (as featured on the King of Fools EP) – 3:23
 "Heavenward" (Navigator Demo Version) - 5:16

Personnel 
Band members
 Tobias Sammet - lead and backing vocals, keyboards
 Jens Ludwig - guitar, backing vocals
 Dirk Sauer - guitar, backing vocals
 Tobias 'Eggi' Exxel - bass, backing vocals
 Felix Bohnke - drums

Additional musicians
Mille Petrozza -  co-lead vocals on track 14
Michael Rodenberg - keyboards, orchestral arrangements
Amanda Somerville, Oliver Hartmann, Ralf Zdiarstek, Thomas Rettke, Daniel Schmitt - backing vocals
The Deutsches Filmorchester Babelsberg conducted by Matthias Suschke

Production
Norman Mieritz, Sascha Paeth - engineers
Michael Schubert - orchestra recordings
Mikko Karmila - mixing
Mika Jussila - mastering at Finnvox Studios, Helsinki

References

Edguy albums
2004 albums
Nuclear Blast albums
Albums with cover art by Jean-Pascal Fournier